Eliezer Yehuda Finkel, also known as Reb Leizer Yudel Finkel, (1879–1965) was the Rosh Yeshiva of Mir yeshiva in both its Polish and Jerusalemic incarnates.

Early life
Finkel was the son of the celebrated Mussar leader, the Alter of Slabodka. He studied under the famed Rabbi Chaim Soloveichik in Brisk (see Brisk yeshiva), where he developed a friendship with Rabbi Shlomo Polachek whom he later met on a fundraising trip in America in 1926. He also studied in Raduń Yeshiva where he was reputed to have mastered the entire Talmud at the age of 17.

In 1903, Finkel married Malka, the daughter of Rabbi Eliyahu Boruch Kamai who was the Rosh Yeshiva of the yeshiva in Mir, Belarus. Three years later he joined the staff of the Mir Yeshiva, and in 1917 became its Rosh Yeshiva upon the death of his father-in-law.

During the interwar period, the Mir Yeshiva flourished under Finkel's leadership to the point that its enrollment grew close to 500 students from all over the world. Also during this time, Reb Leizer Yudel enlisted the services of Rabbi Yeruchom Levovitz to serve as the Mashgiach. Also during this time, Finkel chose one of his prime students, Rabbi Chaim Leib Shmuelevitz as a son-in-law and eventually successor.

World War II and the re-establishment of the Yeshiva

With the outbreak of World War II, the Yeshiva was forced into exile and eventually it found refuge in Kobe, Japan and Shanghai, China. While the student body, led by Rabbi Chaim Shmuelevitz eventually relocated to the United States (see Mir Yeshiva (Brooklyn)), Reb Leizer Yudel established a new branch of the Mir Yeshiva in Jerusalem with a handful of advanced Talmudic students from Etz Chaim Yeshiva.

Eventually Shmuelevitz came to Jerusalem to serve as Rosh Yeshiva under his father-in-law. Reb Leizer Yudel's son Moshe Finkel was the main fundraiser for the newly established Yeshiva and helped the Yeshiva financial support its great numbers. 

 Another son, Rabbi Chaim Zev Finkel became the Mashgiach of the Yeshiva. Yet another son, Rabbi Beinish Finkel succeeded his brother-in-law Rabbi Chaim Shmuelevitz as Rosh Yeshiva upon the latter's death in the 1979.

Lover of Torah
It is related that Reb Leizer Yudel's love of Torah was so great that he is reputed to have offered money for a Chiddush. Many of his own novel interpretations were printed under the title "Yad Eliezer" (יד אליעזר).

References

Rosh yeshivas
Haredi rabbis in Europe
Haredi rabbis in Israel
20th-century Russian rabbis
1879 births
1965 deaths
Lithuanian Haredi rabbis
Burials at Har HaMenuchot
Mir rosh yeshivas
Slabodka yeshiva alumni
People from Mir, Belarus
20th-century rabbis in Jerusalem